Manatí Bridge at Mata de Plátano, also known as Puente Juan José Jiménez and listed as Bridge #321 in Puerto Rico's bridge inventory, was built in 1905 in Hato Viejo, Ciales, Puerto Rico. It was listed on the National Register of Historic Places in 1995.

It was the first truss bridge built in Puerto Rico under the administration of the United States (1898–1900) after the Spanish–American War.

It is a rare type of bridge: a steel double intersection Pratt truss, above a concrete substructure, and is the only such highway bridge in Puerto Rico. The bridge is visited by tourists.

At least 10 railway bridges used the double intersection Pratt truss design, in the French-owned railway that was built during 1890-93 between San Juan and Ponce. Only Cambalache Bridge, across the Arecibo River, survived, as of 1994. The rest were dismantled and sold to cover a bankruptcy by the railroad company that owned them.

It was remodeled in 2010.

Residents complain when the bridge is closed because it is the only direct access from Manatí to Ciales when the bridge from Morovis to Ciales is inaccessible.

In 2018, $6.8 million dollars were earmarked by the US Federal Highway Administration for repairs to the bridge.

Gallery
Views of the canyon and Río Grande de Manatí from Manatí Bridge at Mata de Plátano:

References

External links
 Digital Assets 95000847 on NRHP 
 , National Register of Historic Places cover documentation

Road bridges on the National Register of Historic Places in Puerto Rico
Bridges completed in 1905
Steel bridges
Concrete bridges
1905 establishments in Puerto Rico
Ciales, Puerto Rico
Pratt truss bridges